Midaq Alley (also released as The Alley of Miracles) is a 1995 Mexican film adapted from the novel by Egyptian writer Naguib Mahfouz, written by Vicente Leñero and directed by Jorge Fons. The film deals with complex issues such as gay and lesbian related topics, the lower-middle class of Mexico City, and the lives of many people.

The story is told from three perspectives: Don Ru (Ernesto Gómez Cruz), the owner of a cantina where most of the men in the story gather to drink and play dominoes, Alma (Salma Hayek), the beautiful girl of the neighborhood who dreams of passion, and Susanita (Margarita Sanz who won an Ariel Award for this role), the owner of the apartment complex where Alma and many of the other characters live.

The film was critically acclaimed by international critics. It earned 11 Ariel Awards, including Best Picture at the 37th Ariel Awards and more than 49 international awards and nominations. Pan's Labyrinth and El Callejón de los Milagros were named as the best Mexican films by IMDb and Entertainment Weekly. The film was selected as the Mexican entry for the Best Foreign Language Film at the 68th Academy Awards, but was not accepted as a nominee.

Plot 
The lives of the inhabitants of El Callejón de los Milagros, in downtown Mexico City, are as closely knitted as the threads of a rug. Fifty-something Don Ru owns a small "cantina" where all the men spend afternoons playing domino. He's tired of his longtime marriage with Eusebia and has recently discovered new feelings inside his heart. It does not matter if these feelings are not aimed to a young lady but to a young clerk  after all, as one of the characters says, "it's platonic love". Don Ru's son Chava does not like what he sees and almost kills his father's lover. Running away from Don Ru's anger, Chava escapes to the US with his friend Abel who is deeply in love with beautiful Alma, the daughter of Doña Cata, a tarot reader with bad luck in love. Susanita, the ugly landlady looking for love; Guicho, Don Ru's cynical employee, Maru, Don Fidel, Doña Flor, Zacarias and mean Jose Luis complete the cast of characters of this complex portrait of lives.

Structure 

The film is divided into four successive and clearly labeled chapters. The first three are named after key individuals, and the fourth wraps up the story. Each chapter starts at the same time, with the same game of dominoes, and describes the same time period, but from the viewpoints of the named people; the chapters tell each person's story. Each chapter thus provides the viewer with details which help to explain things which happened in the other chapters.

Rutilio deals with Don Ru's dissatisfaction with his marriage and his poorly hidden homosexual love affair with a young man.
Alma deals with Alma's life and her falling in love with Abel. He leaves with Chava for the U.S. and Alma "disappears". She has been seduced and ends up in a whorehouse.
Susanita is the landlady with horrible teeth whose feelings and romantic hopes are awakened. She marries Guicho.
The Return describes the return of Abel and Chava, and Abel's search for Alma. Chava is married and has his wife and baby boy with him. Abel finds Alma in the whorehouse and is heartbroken. He tries to attack her pimp and is stabbed several times. He dies in her arms.

Cast 
 Ernesto Gómez Cruz as Rutilio (Don Ru)
 María Rojo as Doña Cata
 Salma Hayek as Alma
 Bruno Bichir as Abel
 Delia Casanova as Eusebia
 Margarita Sanz as Susanita
 Claudio Obregón as Don Fidel
 Juan Manuel Bernal as Chava
 Abel Woolrich as Zacarías
 Luis Felipe Tovar as Güicho
 Daniel Giménez Cacho as José Luis
 Gina Morett as Doña Flor
 Óscar Yoldi as Ubaldo El Poeta ("The poet")
 Esteban Soberanes as Jimy
 Eugenia Leñero as Tina
 Tiaré Scanda as Maru

Awards and nominations

Ariel Awards
Won:
 Best Film
 Best Direction for Jorge Fons
 Best Actress for Margarita Sanz
 Best Supporting Actor for Luis Felipe Tovar
 Best Costume Design for Jaime Ortiz
 Best Editing for Carlos Savage hijo
 Best Make-Up for Elvia Romero
 Best Original Music Theme or Song for Lucía Álvarez
 Best Original Score for Lucía Álvarez
 Best Production Design for Carlos Gutiérrez
 Best Screenplay for Vicente Leñero

Nominations:
 Best Actor for Ernesto Gómez Cruz
 Best Actor in a Minor Role for Óscar Yoldi
 Best Actress for Salma Hayek
 Best Actress in a Minor Role for Delia Casanova
 Best Actress in a Minor Role for María Rojo
 Best Cinematography  for Carlos Marcovich
 Best Set Design  for Carlos Gutiérrez
 Best Sound for David Baksht
 Best Supporting Actor for Daniel Giménez Cacho
 Best Supporting Actor for Esteban Soberanes
 Best Supporting Actress  for Tiaré Scanda

Berlin International Film Festival
Wins:
 Special Mention for the exceptional narrative quality
Nominations:
 Golden Bear for Jorge Fons

Chicago International Film Festival
Wins:
 Audience Choice Award"

 Goya Award
Wins:
 Best Spanish Language Foreign Film Gramado Film Festival 
Wins:
 Best Director for Jorge Fons
 Best Supporting Actress for Margarita Sanz

Nominations:
 Best Latin Film Guadalajara Film Festival
Wins:
 Audience Award Havana Film Festival 
Wins:
 Best Director for Jorge Fons
 Best Screenplay for Vicente Leñero
 Grand Coral (First prize) for Jorge Fons

 Mexican Cinema Journalists
Wins:
 Best Film Paraguay Film Festival
Wins:
 Best Actress for Margarita Sanz
 Best Actor for Bruno Bichir

 Toulouse Latin America Film Festival
Wins:
 Special Mention for the distribution of the film

 Valladolid International Film Festival
Wins:
 Best Actor for Bruno Bichir
 Silver Spike for Jorge Fons

Nominations:
 Golden Spike'' for Jorge Fons

See also
 List of submissions to the 68th Academy Awards for Best Foreign Language Film
 List of Mexican submissions for the Academy Award for Best Foreign Language Film

References

External links
 
 
 
 El Callejón de los Milagros at Yahoo! Movies

1995 films
Best Picture Ariel Award winners
1990s erotic drama films
Films directed by Jorge Fons
Films based on Egyptian novels
Mexican LGBT-related films
1990s Spanish-language films
Films set in Mexico
Mexican erotic drama films
Films set in Mexico City
1995 drama films
LGBT-related drama films
1990s Mexican films